Mary Is Happy, Mary Is Happy is a Thai Coming-of-age/Drama/Black-Comedy film written and directed by Nawapol Thamrongrattanarit, starring Patcha Poonpiriya, Chonnikan Netjui and Wasupol Kriangprapakit. The film was created from 410 tweets of @marylony in chronological order which revolves around "Mary" (Patcha Poonpiriya) and her friend "Suri" (Chonnikan Netjui) who were studying in a fictional high school. The film was one of three films which were developed, produced and funded by Venice Biennale in 2013 and had its world premiere at the Venice Film Festival.

Cast
Patcha Poonpiriya as Mary
Chonnikan Netjui as Suri Aksornsawang
Wasupol Kriangprapakit as M

Release 
Mary Is Happy, Mary Is Happy had its world premiere at the Venice Film Festival on 1 September 2013. The film had its Asia premiere at the Busan International Film Festival, beginning 3 October 2013, and screened at the Valdivia International Film Festival on 11 October 2013, the Tokyo International Film Festival on 19 October 2013, the Hong Kong Asian Film Festival starting 8 November 2013, and the Torino Film Festival starting 22 November 2013.

The film had its limited release in Thailand on 28 November 2013 in selected theatres in Bangkok.

References

External links

Thai independent films
Thai national heritage films